is a female vocal originally released for Vocaloid 2. The data for the voice was created by sampling the voice of Yuri Masuda, a Japanese vocalist of the Japanese musical group m.o.v.e.

Development
Lily originally appeared on the cover of the CD "anim.o.v.e. 01" released on Aug 19th, 2009 before the announcement of her VOCALOID development. Lily was introduced as "Code Name: Lily" on DTM MAGAZINE published in May, 2010. The voice source is the lead vocalist of m.o.v.e., Yuri Masuda. The idea of the developing a VOCALOID based on Yuri's voice occurred, as one of the members was a user of VOCALOID. The illustration of Lily's VOCALOID was used on the Anim.o.v.e album while the voicebank was in development.

Additional software
V3 Lily was announced in early 2012 for Vocaloid 3. One of the earliest notes about this was that the new V3 Lily vocal would have a slightly larger vocal range. In July 2013, Internet co.,Ltd announced a Mac update of this product for the Vocaloid Neo engine.  Two vocals were included with the package V3 Lily; Native which is an update of the Vocaloid 2 vocal and V3 Lily, which was a newly recorded voice.  When imported into Vocaloid 4, the vocals will be able to cross-synthesis with each other.

Lily and Gackpoid were brought up in a tweet during the Megpoid English development.  But English vocals could only occur if they were profitable. 
In October 2014 it was noted they currently have no plans for a Lily English.:

Characteristics

Video Game
Lily appeared in an iOS game called "Vocadol" along with Vocals Anon & Kanon, VY1, Aoki Lapis, Merli, Cul and Kokone.

References

Vocaloids introduced in 2010
Fictional singers
Japanese idols
Japanese popular culture